Lake Nottely (also called Nottely Reservoir) is one of many reservoirs of the Tennessee Valley Authority. It is located entirely in Union County, Georgia in the United States and within the Chatahoochee-Oconee National Forests. Formed in 1942 by the damming of the Nottely River, Nottely Reservoir extends 20 miles (30 km) upstream to the town of Blairsville.

Construction of Nottely Dam began in 1941 and was completed in 1942. The dam is 184 feet (56 m) high and stretches 2,300 feet (701 m) across the Nottely River. Its primary purpose was for flood control in the Tennessee River watershed, but in the 1950s a single 15 megawatt generator was installed for power generation.

Approximately 70% of the shoreline is under the jurisdiction of the United States Forest Service and undeveloped.  In recent years, many new homes and properties have contributed to Lake Nottely's growing importance for recreation.  Its proximity to Atlanta (2 hours) is resulting in increased use of this reservoir.

See also
 List of dams and reservoirs of the Tennessee River

Hiwassee River
Reservoirs in Georgia (U.S. state)
Tennessee Valley Authority
Protected areas of Union County, Georgia
Bodies of water of Union County, Georgia